Emal is an Afghan masculine given name. Notable people with the name include:

 Emal Gariwal (born 1984), Afghan football goalkeeper
 Emal Pasarly (born 1974), Afghan multimedia editor for the BBC
 Emal Zeni (born 1992), Afghan weapons trader

See also
 Amal (given name)

Afghan masculine given names